Esthefany Lizeth Espino Paredes (born 16 August 1999) is a Peruvian footballer who plays as a defensive midfielder for Club Universitario de Deportes and the Peru women's national team.

International career
Espino represented Peru at the 2016 South American U-17 Women's Championship and two South American U-20 Women's Championship editions (2015 and 2018). At senior level, she played the 2018 Copa América Femenina and the 2019 Pan American Games.

References

1999 births
Living people
Women's association football midfielders
Peruvian women's footballers
People from Ica, Peru
Peru women's international footballers
Pan American Games competitors for Peru
Footballers at the 2019 Pan American Games
Club Universitario de Deportes footballers
21st-century Peruvian women